Ralf Socher (born 6 April 1967) is a Canadian retired alpine skier who competed in the 1994 Winter Olympics.

Socher was born  in Vancouver, British Columbia.

External links
 sports-reference.com
 

1967 births
Living people
Alpine skiers at the 1994 Winter Olympics
Olympic alpine skiers of Canada
Skiers from Vancouver
Canadian male alpine skiers
20th-century Canadian people